The Doctor of Sacred Theology (abbreviated STD), also sometimes known as Professor of Sacred Theology (abbreviated STP), is the final theological degree in the pontifical university system of the Roman Catholic Church, being the ecclesiastical equivalent of the academic Doctor of Theology (ThD) degree.

The two terms were once used in the ancient and formerly Catholic universities of Oxford, Cambridge, and Dublin, as an alternative name for the degree of Doctor of Divinity (DD), a practice which has now been discontinued.

Overview
The degree builds upon the work of the Bachelor of Sacred Theology (STB) and the Licentiate of Sacred Theology (STL). Normally, the STB is earned in three years, provided the candidate has at least two years of undergraduate study of philosophy before entering an STB program (if not, the STB will take five years; Sapientia Christiana assumes this to be the normal situation). The STL is normally earned in an additional two years, and the STD is earned after the writing, defense and publication of the doctoral dissertation (an additional 2–3 years).  At institutions that offer both civil and church doctorates, the requirements of the STD will usually—although not always—be shaped so that those reading for the award can receive a Th.D. or Ph.D. in the process of meeting the requirements of the STD.

This compares with, for example in North American institutions, the four-year program for a BA at many universities, a two-year program for an MA, and the writing and successful defense of the doctoral dissertation for the Ph.D. or Th.D. (an additional 2–3 years).

A sketch of the degree cycle and requirements for ecclesiastical degrees can be found in John Paul II's apostolic constitution, Sapientia Christiana.

The STD, or the Doctor of Canon Law (DCL or JCD), is the preferred qualification for teaching theology or canon law on a Catholic university faculty or for holding certain other posts of administration. In addition, the STD is usually required for a permanent post on the theology faculty of an ecclesiastical or pontifical university.  However, this requirement can be waived if a teacher holds an STL. John Paul II's Sapientia Christiania notes that in the event where a doctorate is non-canonical, "the teacher will usually be required to have at least a canonical licentiate." (SC, Article 17).

In the US, although it may have more stringent entry requirements than a Ph.D. in theology, it is a research degree that is considered by the US National Science Foundation to be the equivalent of a Doctor of Philosophy.

Professor of Sacred Theology

See also
Academic degree
Licentiate in Theology

References

Sacred
Religious degrees
Catholic education